Henry William Milton (June 2, 1912 – June 25, 1943), nicknamed "Streak", was an American Negro league outfielder from 1932 to 1940.

A native of Winona, Mississippi, Milton attended Washington High School in East Chicago, Indiana, and Wiley College, where he played college football. He made his Negro leagues debut in 1932 with the Indianapolis ABCs, and went on to play six seasons with the Kansas City Monarchs. Milton was selected to play in the East–West All-Star Game in five consecutive seasons from 1936 to 1940. He died of spinal meningitis in Crown Point, Indiana in 1943 at age 31.

References

External links
 and Baseball-Reference Black Baseball stats and Seamheads

1912 births
1943 deaths
Indianapolis ABCs (1931–1933) players
Kansas City Monarchs players
Baseball outfielders
Baseball players from Mississippi
People from Winona, Mississippi
Deaths from meningitis
Neurological disease deaths in Indiana
Infectious disease deaths in Indiana
20th-century African-American sportspeople